Tu Hui-mei (born 25 April 1977) is a Taiwanese softball player. She competed in the women's tournament at the 1996 Summer Olympics.

References

External links
 

1977 births
Living people
Taiwanese softball players
Olympic softball players of Taiwan
Softball players at the 1996 Summer Olympics
Place of birth missing (living people)
Asian Games medalists in softball
Softball players at the 1998 Asian Games
Medalists at the 1998 Asian Games
Asian Games bronze medalists for Chinese Taipei